Malki Kawa is an American sports agent and manager known for representing multiple high-profile athletes in mixed martial arts and American football. He has represented athletes such as Jon Jones, Anthony Pettis, B.J. Penn, Jorge Masvidal, and Kendrick Norton.

Career
Before pursuing sports management, Kawa worked in the finance and real estate businesses, eventually having his own real estate office with his brother, Abraham Kawa. In the midst of his real estate career, he became credentialed as an NFL agent in 2005. After experiencing the death of their father and the effects of the financial crisis of 2007–2008 on their business, the Kawa brothers founded First Round Management in 2008. Malki Kawa is currently the CEO of First Round Management.

In 2018, Kawa facilitated the first fighter "trade" between two independent mixed martial arts promotions when the UFC exchanged the rights for his client Demetrious Johnson for the rights to sign ONE Championship's Ben Askren. Both fighters were released from their contracts with an agreement that they would sign a contract with the other promotion.

Athletes represented
Athletes Kawa has represented:
 Alistair Overeem
 Anthony Pettis
 Antonio Callaway
 Benson Henderson
 B.J. Penn
 Carlos Condit
 Demetrious Johnson
 Frank Mir
 Paige VanZant
 James Houston IV
 Jorge Masvidal
 Jon Jones
 Kendrick Norton
 Reuben Foster
 Tyron Woodley
 Yoel Romero

See also

Ultimate Fighting Championship
Mixed martial arts

References

Living people
American sports agents
American people of Jordanian descent
Year of birth missing (living people)